Peter Levine may refer to:
 Peter A. Levine (born 1942), psychotherapist and creator of somatic experiencing.
 Peter J. Levine (born  1961), general partner at the Silicon Valley venture capital firm Andreessen Horowitz.
 Peter G. Levine (born 1960), American stroke researcher and educator.
 Peter Levine (born 1967), Tufts University political scientist and organizer of Civic Studies.

See also
Peter Levin (disambiguation)